Konthoujam Boboi Singh is an Indian footballer who plays as a defender for Churchill Brothers and Sporting Clube de Goa in the I-League.

References

External links
 

1988 births
Living people
Footballers from Manipur
Indian footballers
Churchill Brothers FC Goa players
Association football goalkeepers